Tragocephala univittipennis is a species of beetle in the family Cerambycidae. It was described by Stephan von Breuning in 1974. It is known from Tanzania.

References

Endemic fauna of Tanzania
univittipennis
Beetles described in 1974